Yalumba is an Australian winery located near the town of Angaston, South Australia in the Barossa Valley wine region. It was founded by a British brewer, Samuel Smith, who emigrated to Australia with his family from Wareham, Dorset in August 1847 aboard the ship China. Upon arriving in Adelaide in December, Smith built a small house on the banks of the River Torrens. He lived there less than a year before moving north to Angaston where he purchased a  block of land on the settlement's south eastern boundary. He named his property "Yalumba" after an indigenous Australian word for "all the land around". In 1849 Smith and his son Sidney planted Yalumba's first vineyards, beginning the Yalumba dynasty. Today Yalumba is Australia's oldest family-owned winery.

Overview

Yalumba is part of Australian wine alliance Australia's First Families of Wine, a multimillion-dollar venture to help resurrect the fortunes of the $6 billion industry while highlighting the quality and diversity of Australian wine. The  alliance includes Brown Brothers, Campbells, Taylors, DeBortoli, McWilliam’s, Tahbilk, Tyrell’s, Yalumba, D'Arenberg, Howard Park, Jim Barry and Henschke. The main criteria are that the family-owned companies need to have a "landmark wine" in their portfolios as listed under Langton’s Classification and/or 75% agreement by group that a wine is considered "iconic"; have the ability to do at least a 20-year vertical tasting; have a history going back a minimum of two generations; have ownership of vineyards more than 50 years old and/or ownership of distinguished sites which exemplify the best of terroir; and be paid-up members of the Winemakers Federation of Australia.

See also
 Australian wine
 List of wineries in the Barossa Valley

References

External links
 Yalumba official website
 Australia's first families of Wine

Wineries in South Australia
Barossa Valley
Family-owned companies of Australia
Australian companies established in 1849
Food and drink companies established in 1849